Govindankutty may refer to:

 N. Govindan Kutty, Indian actor in Malayalam language films
 P. Govindan Kutty, Kathakali artiste par excellence and dance guru
 Govindankutty Adoor, Indian actor in Malayalam language films

See also 
 Govindan